Lavern "Vern" Pyles, Jr. (May 17, 1919 – June 20, 2013) was a Republican member of the Pennsylvania House of Representatives.

Born in Washington, D.C., he worked as a cable slicer for AT&T and then went to Clemson University where he received his degree in civil engineering. He served in the United States Navy during World War II and then served in the Navy Civil Engineer Corps. After his retirement from the United States Navy in 1967, he worked as a civil engineer in Pennsylvania before retiring in 1982. He died in Lansdale, Pennsylvania.

References

1919 births
2013 deaths
People from Washington, D.C.
Clemson University alumni
Republican Party members of the Pennsylvania House of Representatives
United States Navy personnel of World War II
People from Lansdale, Pennsylvania
Deaths from cancer in Pennsylvania
United States Navy sailors